Bomarea lanata is a species of plant in the Alstroemeriaceae family. It is endemic to Ecuador.  Its natural habitat is subtropical or tropical moist montane forests. It is threatened by habitat loss.

References

Flora of Ecuador
lanata
Vulnerable plants
Taxonomy articles created by Polbot